Teacher Training College, Gaya also known by TTC, Gaya is a unit of Buddha Group of Institutions, is a Bachelor of Education college situated in Gaya, Bihar, India. It was established in 2008. The college,  approved by NCTE for M.Ed, B.Ed & D.El.Ed, and the University Grants Commission.

Courses
 M.Ed
 B.Ed
 D.El.Ed

See also
 List of teacher education schools in India

References

External links
 Official Website : Teacher Training College, Gaya

Universities and colleges in Bihar
Education in Gaya, India
Colleges of education in India
2008 establishments in Bihar
Educational institutions established in 2008